Josephine Hill (October 3, 1899 – December 17, 1989) was an American film actress, primarily during the silent era. She appeared in more than 100 films between 1917 and 1933.

Before she worked in films, Hill performed in Gus Edwards's School Days vaudeville act.

She was married to Western star Jack Perrin from 1920 until their divorce in 1937. She was born in San Francisco and died in Palm Springs, California. She is buried at Desert Memorial Park in Cathedral City, California as Josephine Hill Brown.

Selected filmography

 The Voice on the Wire (1917)
 The Fighting Heart (1919)
 The Four-Bit Man (1919)
 The Jack of Hearts (1919)
 The Face in the Watch (1919)
 The Tell Tale Wire (1919)
 The Lone Hand (1919)
 The Double Hold-Up (1919)
 The Jay Bird (1920)
 West Is Best (1920)
 The Sheriff's Oath (1920)
 Parlor, Bedroom and Bath (1920)
 Burnt Wings (1920)
 The Man Trackers (1921)
 Night Life in Hollywood (1922)
 Lone Fighter (1923)
 Winning a Woman (1925)
 Josselyn's Wife (1926)
 The High Hand (1926)
 The Man from Oklahoma (1926)
 The Blind Trail (1926)
 Two-Gun of the Tumbleweed (1927)
 Heroes of the Wild (1927)
 The Sky Rider (1928)
 Silent Sentinel (1929)
 The Kid from Arizona (1931)
 Wild West Whoopee (1931)
 West of Cheyenne (1931)

References

External links

 

1899 births
1989 deaths
Burials at Desert Memorial Park
American film actresses
American silent film actresses
20th-century American actresses
Actresses from San Francisco
Vaudeville performers
Western (genre) film actresses